was a town located in Tano District, Gunma Prefecture, Japan.

On January 1, 2006, Onishi was merged into the expanded city of Fujioka.

As of 2005, the town had an estimated population of 7,011 and a density of 133.7 persons per km2. The total area was 52.45 km2.

External links
 Fujioka official website in Japanese
 Shiro Oni International Artist Residency in Onishi, Gunma, Japan in English and Japanese

Dissolved municipalities of Gunma Prefecture